Brian Andrew Whiteley (born 1983) is a visual artist and curator based in New York City.

Work

Whiteley's artistic practice incorporates various mediums including sculpture, video, and new media. Working primarily as an investigatory performance artist, he is best known for his large-scale, interactive projects meant to manipulate media outlets through incitement and provocation. His specific series have delved into pop culture, product marketing, sexual fetishes, relationship identifiers, film satire, gender roles, and cultural stereotypes.

Trump Tombstone

In 2016, Whiteley gained public notoriety through his controversial and widely publicized Trump Tombstone.

The 500-pound gravestone dedicated to Republican Party presidential candidate Donald Trump was originally uncovered in the early hours of Easter Sunday in New York City's Central Park. The stone read "Made America Hate Again" and listed Trump, Donald J in sharp letters. Although it was taken down in a matter of hours, images of the work circulated on social media and police searched for the culprit, the artist remained unidentified nearly two months, although he gave an anonymous interviews affirming the work as "political satire and a guerrilla art piece."

After an extensive investigation by the Secret Service and the NYPD, Whiteley was revealed as the creator of the Trump Tombstone. The Secret Service and NYPD interrogated the artist in his home, asking him "if he owned a gun, if he attended presidential rallies, and about the books he read." Whiteley was never charged with a crime and was eventually allowed to pick up the tombstone from the NYPD evidence locker.

Clowns and Bigfoot

In 2013, Whiteley began an ongoing series of public performances, sculptures, and installations that comment on American pop culture phenomena through various characters such as clowns and Bigfoot. Through these various personas, Whiteley explored how the media substantiates works of art and how far can he can push them on coverage.

Whiteley has been credited as the originator of the widespread 2016 Clown Sightings in the United States.

Art fairs

Whiteley is the founder of Miami's annual SATELLITE Art Show.

References 

Artists from New York City
1983 births
Living people